= Cann table =

Method of displaying data in a league table

A Cann table, or visual league table, is a method of displaying data in a league table.

The purpose of the table is to give some idea of the actual points gap between the teams in the league by listing them next to their current points total. Where teams are tied on points, teams are then ranked by goal difference from left to right and games played are shown in brackets. Unlike a traditional league table, a row is left blank if no team has the corresponding number of points.

It is named posthumously after Jenny Cann, an Arsenal F.C. supporter who published the style, a visual table, on her website, the 'Clock End', from 1998. She died in 2003.

== Example ==
Points	Team (Matches played)
52	Arsenal (24)
51	
50	
49	
48	
47	Manchester United (24)
46	
45	Newcastle United (24)
44	
43	
42	
41	Chelsea (24)
40	
39	Everton (24)
38	Liverpool (24); Tottenham Hotspur (24)
37	
36	Southampton (24)
35	
34	Blackburn Rovers (24); Manchester City (24)
33	Charlton Athletic (24)
32	
31	Leeds United (24)
30	Middlesbrough (24)
29	Aston Villa (24)
28	
27	Fulham (23)
26	Birmingham City (24)
25	
24	
23	
22	
21	Bolton Wanderers (24)
20	
19	Sunderland (24)
18	
17	West Bromwich Albion (23)
16	West Ham United (24)
